Teresita Fernández (born 1968) is a New York-based visual artist best known for her public sculptures and unconventional use of materials. Her work is characterized by an interest in perception and the psychology of looking. Her experiential, large-scale works are often inspired by landscape and natural phenomena as well as diverse historical and cultural references.  Her sculptures present spectacular optical illusions and evoke natural phenomena, land formations, and water in its infinite forms.

She is a recipient of a Guggenheim Fellowship (2003), and the John D. and Catherine T. MacArthur Foundation "Genius Grant" (2005). She served as a presidential appointee to Barack Obama's U.S. Commission of Fine Arts, distinguishing her the first Latina to serve in that role.

Early life and education 
Fernández was born in Miami, Florida to Cuban parents in exile. Her family fled Fidel Castro's regime in July 1959, six months after the Cuban Revolution. As a child, she spent much of her time creating in the atelier of her great aunts and grandmother, all of whom had been trained as highly skilled couture seamstresses in Havana, Cuba.

In 1986, Fernández graduated from Southwest Miami High School. She received a Bachelor of Fine Arts from Florida International University in 1990, and a Masters of Fine Art from Virginia Commonwealth University in 1992.

Career 
In 2009 the Blanton Museum of Art at the University of Texas at Austin commissioned the large permanent work titled Stacked Waters that occupies the museum's Rapoport Atrium. Stacked Waters consists of 3,100 square feet of custom-cast acrylic that covers the walls in a striped pattern. The work's title alludes to artist Donald Judd's "stacked" sculptures—series of identical boxes installed vertically along wall surfaces—as well as to his sculptural explorations of box interiors. Fernández noticed how The Blanton's atrium functions like a box, and given its architectural nods to the arches of Roman baths and cisterns, she sought to fill its spatial volume with an illusion of water.

Also in 2009, Fernández had a piece called "Starfield" made up of mirrored glass cubes on anodized aluminum in the AT&T Stadium in Arlington, Texas.

In 2013, Fernández was featured in a contemporary art installation at Cornell Fine Arts Museum's  Alfond Inn in Winter Park, FL. The work displayed was titled "Nocturnal (Cobalt Panorama)".

On June 1, 2015, "Fata Morgana", her largest public art project to date opened in New York's Madison Square Park. The Madison Square Park Conservancy presented the outdoor sculpture consisting of 500 running feet of golden, mirror-polished discs that create canopies above the pathways around the park's central Oval Lawn.

In 2017, Fernández, in collaboration with Colección Patricia Phelps de Cisneros, created a site-specific installation called "OVERLOOK: Teresita Fernández confronts Frederic Church at Olana" at Olana State Historic Site. As part of the work, Fernández juxtaposes the works of landscape artists like Frederic Church, Marianne North, Martin Johnson Heade, among others, with images of indigenous people and their fellow travellers in order to examine and illustrate the context of the world that made up their images.

Harvard University Committee on the Arts commissioned Autumn (... Nothing Personal) a public art project by Fernández in 2018.

Advocacy for the arts 
Fernández is well known for advocating for Latinx artists and in 2016 she partnered with the Ford Foundation to organize the U.S. Latinx Arts Futures Symposium, a landmark gathering of Latinx artists with museum directors, curators, scholars, educators, demographers, and funders from across the country to confront the omission of Latina, Latino, and Latinx artists from U.S. arts institutions. Partnering with the Ford Foundation in 2016, Fernández helped found and create the U.S. Latinx Arts Futures Symposium. The symposium was organized to create a dialogue on how to more broadly represent Latino art across the full spectrum of creative disciplines. In her opening address for the U.S. Latinx Arts Futures Symposium, Fernández indicated that her the event was meant to create an intersection between "the powerful and the voiceless."

Her work has created space in the artworld for Latina artists and her advocacy has cleared a path for emerging Latinx artists. One direct result of the U.S. Latinx Arts Futures Symposium's was the Whitney Museum of American Art hire of the museum's first curator specializing in Latinx art.

Awards
 1994: CINTAS Fellowship
 1995: Metro-Dade Cultural Consortium Grant (Miami, FL)
 1999: Louis Comfort Tiffany Foundation Biennial Award
 2003: Guggenheim Fellowship (New York, NY)
 2005: MacArthur Fellows Program
 2013: Aspen Art Museum Aspen Award for Art (Aspen, CO)
 2016: Art in General Visionary Artist Honoree (New York, NY)

Exhibitions 

 1995: "Real/More Real", Museum of Contemporary Art (Miami, FL)
 1997: Corcoran Gallery of Art (Washington, DC)
 1998: Artpace (San Antonio, TX)
 1999: Institute of Contemporary Art (Philadelphia, PA)
 2000: "supernova." Berkeley Art Museum/Matrix (Berkeley, CA)
 2000: Site Santa-Fe(Santa Fe, NM)
 2001: Castello di Rivoli (Turin, Italy)
 2002: Miami Art Museum (Miami, FL)
 2003: Grand Arts (Kansas City, MO)
 2005: Centro de Arte Contemporáneo de Málaga (Málaga, Spain)
 2005: Fabric Workshop and Museum (Philadelphia, PA)
 2009: "Blind Landscape." Contemporary Art Museum, University of South Florida, (Tampa, FL); Blanton Museum of Art (Austin, TX)
 2011: "Blind Landscape." Museum of Contemporary Art Cleveland (Cleveland, OH)
 2011: "Focus: Teresita Fernández." Modern Art Museum (Fort Worth, TX)
 2011: "Pivot Points V." Museum of Contemporary Art (Miami, FL)
 2014: Golden Panorama, Aspen Art Museum (Elk Camp, Aspen, CO)
 2014: Kyoto University of Art and Design (Kyoto, Japan)
 2015-2016: "Fata Morgana." Madison Square Park (New York, NY)
 2017: "OVERLOOK: Teresita Fernández confronts Frederic Church at Olana. A collaboration with the Colección Patricia Phelps de Cisneros." Olana State Historic Site (Columbia County, New York)
 2018: Autumn (Nothing Personal…), Harvard University (Boston, MA)
 2019 New Orleans Museum of Art Commission (New Orleans, LA)
 2019-2022: "Ruby City" Linda Pace Foundation Collection (San Antonio, TX)
 2019-2020: "Teresita Fernández: Elemental." Pérez Art Museum Miami (Miami, FL)
 2020: "Teresita Fernández: Elemental." Phoenix Art Museum (Phoenix, AZ)
 2020-2021: "Maelstrom" Lehmann Maupin Gallery (New York, NY)

References

Further reading 

 Allen S. Weiss (2001). Teresita Fernández (exhibition catalogue). Santa Fe, NM: SITE Santa Fe. 
 Marcella Beccaria (2001). Teresita Fernández (exhibition catalogue, in Italian and English). Rivoli, Italy: Castello di Rivoli. 
 Gregory Volk, David Norr, Amy Hauft, Elizabeth King (2008). Teresita Fernández (exhibition catalogue). Richmond, VA: Reynolds Gallery. .
 David Louis Norr (editor) (2009). Teresita Fernández: Blind Landscape (exhibition catalogue). Zurich: JRP Ringier. .
 Brooke Kamin Rapaport, Beverly Adams (2015). Fata Morgana (exhibition catalogue). New York, NY: Madison Square Park Conservancy. .
 Denise Markonish (editor) (2017). Teresita Fernández: Wayfinding (exhibition catalogue). New York, NY: DelMonico Books/Prestel. .
 

1968 births
Living people
Artists from Miami
MacArthur Fellows
American women sculptors
Place of birth missing (living people)
American installation artists
American conceptual artists
Women conceptual artists
Sculptors from Florida
21st-century American women artists
Hispanic and Latino American artists